Héctor Luis Cuevas (born 31 August 1982 in Córdoba, Argentina) is an Argentine former professional footballer who played as a forward.

References

1982 births
Living people
Footballers from Córdoba, Argentina
Argentine footballers
Association football forwards
Primera Nacional players
Sarmiento de Resistencia footballers
Club Atlético Douglas Haig players
9 de Julio de Rafaela players
PAS Giannina F.C. players
Argentine expatriate footballers
Argentine expatriate sportspeople in Greece
Expatriate footballers in Greece
Argentine expatriate sportspeople in Mexico
Expatriate footballers in Mexico